Câmpina is a city in Prahova County, Romania, north of the county seat Ploiești, located on the main route between Wallachia and Transylvania. Its existence is first attested in a document of 1503. It is situated in the historical region of Muntenia.

History
Formerly a customs point on the trade route between Transylvania and Wallachia, the town developed at the end of the 19th century and the beginning of the 20th century as an oil extraction and processing center. Between 1897 and 1898, Câmpina was the site of the largest oil refinery in Europe.

Notable residents
Bogdan Petriceicu Hașdeu, philologist and writer
Eugen Jebeleanu, poet
Nicolae Grigorescu, painter
Henrik Kacser (1918–1995), biochemist and geneticist

Climate
Câmpina has a humid continental climate (Cfb in the Köppen climate classification).

<div style="width:70%;">

Tourist attractions
Nicolae Grigorescu Memorial Museum
Iulia Hasdeu Castle
Biserica de la Han (de la brazi) (The Inn Church)
Geo Bogza Cultural Center
Casa Tineretului (The House of the Youth)
The House with Griffons (the actual city-hall), the first building with electric gates in Romania.
The Hernea Chapel
The Saint Nicholas Parish
Fântâna cu Cireși (on the Muscel hill)
Muscel, Ciobu and Piţigaia hills
Prahova and Doftana riverbanks
Near "Paltinu" Dam

Education
There are 5 high schools in Câmpina:
Nicolae Grigorescu National College
Forestier Industrial High School
Energetic Industrial High School
Constantin Istrati Technical College
Machines Construction Industrial High School

There is also a Police Agents School in Câmpina, Școala de Agenți de Poliție "Vasile Lascăr", one of the two police agent schools in the country and Louis Pasteur Nursing and Pharma School.

Sport
The city is home to the 3rd-division football club FC Unirea Câmpina and to 4th-division football club FCM Câmpina, founded in 1936.

Population
1900:  2,500
1912:  8,500
1948: 22,800
2002: 38,758
2011: 32,935

References

External links

Cities in Romania
Populated places in Prahova County
Localities in Muntenia